Gornje Stravče is a village in Podgorica, the capital and largest city of Montenegro.

Demographics
According to the 2011 census, it had a population of 10.

References

Populated places in Podgorica Municipality